British rock band Mumford & Sons have released four studio albums, three live albums, six studio extended plays (three collaborations), seven live extended plays and twenty-one singles.

The band's debut studio album, Sigh No More, was released in October 2009. It was a commercial success, hitting the top ten in multiple countries, including their native United Kingdom, where it peaked at number 2. It has since been certified five times platinum by the British Phonographic Industry (BPI). Four singles were released from the album, including the international hits "Little Lion Man" and "The Cave".

Babel, the band's second studio album, was released in September 2012. It was preceded by the release of its lead single, "I Will Wait", which peaked at number 12 in the UK and the US, as well becoming a top 40 hit in countries such as Australia.

Their third album Wilder Mind, was released in May 2015 and debuted at number one in the UK, the US, Australia, Canada, Ireland, the Netherlands and Norway.

Albums

Studio albums

Live albums

Extended plays

Studio extended plays

Live extended plays

Singles

Promotional singles

Other charted songs

Guest appearances

Music videos

Notes

References

External links
 Mumford & Sons at AllMusic
 
 

Rock music group discographies
Discographies of British artists
Folk music discographies